King Benlli was a British king who ruled part of what is now Wales in the early 5th century. He is notorious for opposing Saint Germanus and was probably a heretical follower of Pelagianism. The story of his admonishment by the saint and eventual demise by "fire from heaven" is recorded in Historia Brittonum, chapters 32–35. The hill fort at Foel Fenlli is traditionally considered to have been his castle.

History of Wales
5th-century Welsh monarchs